Together Gibraltar (TG) is a progressive political party in Gibraltar founded on 28 November 2018.

Together Gibraltar was founded in 2017 as a political organisation by independent MP Marlene Hassan Nahon, formerly of the Gibraltar Social Democrats. On 17 October 2018 at a general meeting, 86% of the organisation's membership voted for it to become a political party, with the aim of contesting the 2019 Gibraltar general election. On 8 November 2018, Hassan Nahon announced that the party launch was scheduled for 28 November. Nahon retained her seat in the 2019 elections, but no other TG candidates were elected.

Election results

Parliament of Gibraltar

References

Political parties in Gibraltar
Political parties established in 2018
2018 establishments in Gibraltar